Saltillo is the capital and largest city of the northeastern Mexican state of Coahuila and is also the municipal seat of the municipality of the same name. Mexico City, Monterrey, and Saltillo are all connected by a major railroad and highway. As of a 2020 census, Saltillo had a population of 879,958 people, while the population of its metropolitan area was 1,031,779, making Saltillo the largest city in the state of Coahuila, and the 14th most populated metropolitan area in the country.

Saltillo is one of the most industrialized areas of Mexico and has one of the largest automotive industries in the country, with plants such as Tupy, Grupo Industrial Saltillo, General Motors, Stellantis, Daimler AG, Freightliner Trucks, Delphi, Plastic Omnium, Magna, and Nemak operating in the region. Saltillo is a manufacturing centre noted for commercial, communications, and manufacturing of products both traditional and modern.

History

Colonial era

Founded in 1577 by Conquistador Alberto del Canto, Saltillo is the oldest post-conquest settlement in Northern Mexico. In 1591, the Spanish resettled a community of their Tlaxcaltec allies in a separate nearby village, San Esteban de Nueva Tlaxcala. The Spanish did this in order to cultivate the land and to aid stalled colonization efforts. Saltillo grew slowly due to hostility from the indigenous Chichimeca people and water shortages, and a 100 years after its founding its population was only about 300. In comparison, the population of the adjoining Tlaxcalan town at the time, San Esteban, was about 1,750.

In the eighteenth century, Saltillo was a commercial center on the northern frontier which served as a bridge from central Mexico to regions further northeast such as Nuevo León, Nuevo Santander, Coahuila, and Texas. It also supplied the silver mines of Zacatecas with wheat. It never rose to great prominence, but did develop a commercial core and an agricultural and ranching sector that supplied its needs, with surpluses that could be sold. Saltillo became administratively important at the end of the eighteenth century, when a branch of the Royal Treasury was established in the city. Merchants, most of whom were Iberian Peninsula-born Spaniards, constituted the most important economic group, handling a wide variety of goods and selling in shops. They were the provincial branch of the transatlantic merchant sector, with ties to Mexico City merchants. Peninsular merchants in Saltillo married into the local elite society, acquired rural properties, and sought local office. In the late seventeenth century, an annual trade fair was established, which carried Mexican livestock and manufactured goods to places as far as China and Europe. Saltillo could produce wheat commercially as long as there was access to water, but as with many other parts of the North, drought was a consistent threat. In the eighteenth century, there was a demand for draft animals, which Saltillo supplied.

Early Mexico
In 1824, Saltillo was made the capital of the state of Coahuila y Tejas which included most of the territory of the current U.S. state of Texas until it was lost in the 1836 Texas Revolution. The Republic of Texas continued to have border disputes with Mexico's Centralist Republic, which continued to object to its independence; peace was further disturbed by Comanche and Apache raiding, private vendettas, and separatist movements. The 23 October 1840 Battle of Saltillo occurred when 110 Texians and Tejanos crossed the Rio Grande to attack the city's government in support of an attempt to create a separate Republic of the Rio Grande between Texas and Mexico. In 1845, Texas was annexed by the United States and its disputes with Mexico, aggravated by the Polk Administration, soon expanded into the Mexican–American War. The first phase of the war ended in September 1846 with Gen.Zachary Taylor's hard-won siege and occupation of Monterrey in Nuevo León. The War Department ordered him to remain there, but Taylor violated the armistice and went with Gen.William Worth and 1200 men to occupy Saltillo on 16 November to protect the approaches to his main army in Monterrey. Antonio López de Santa Anna had been allowed through the blockade of Veracruz to bring the war to a swift conclusion but had instead rallied the Mexican army and moved north. Gen.John E. Wool was sent to nearby Agua Nueva on 21 December and the indecisive Battle of Buena Vista occurred  from Saltillo on 22 and 23 February 1847, after which López de Santa Anna's army was forced to move south to protect San Luis Potosí and counter a seaborne invasion by Gen.Winfield Scott.

Porfiriato and Mexican Revolution
Modernity reached Coahuila with the arrival of the railroad in 1880, during the Porfiriato. In 1890, telegraph, telephone, and street lighting networks were created in addition to the construction of cultural buildings, including theaters and plazas, and buildings of a social nature such as hospices, civil hospitals, and sanitary structures consisting of drinking water and drainage systems.

During the 19101920 Mexican Revolution, Saltillo was taken in separate events by the forces of Victoriano Huerta, Francisco Villa, and then by those of Venustiano Carranza. Hundreds of peasants were forced to join these various groups. As a result, many fled to Texas, including aristocratic families.

20th century

In 1923 the Antonio Narro Agrarian University was founded. Two decades later in 1943, the Monterrey Institute of Technology and Higher Education was established in the city, then in 1951, the Technological Institute of Saltillo and in 1957, the Autonomous University of Coahuila was established.

Saltillo's agricultural climate in the second half of the 20th century was rapidly transforming into industrial activity; huge orchards disappeared and factories began to dominate the landscape.

In the second quarter of the twentieth century, Saltillo changed from agricultural and textile activities towards industrial activities, with the creation of companies such as CIFUNSA, CINSA, Éxito, and Molinos el Fénix, among others. 

The true industrial explosion occurred in the '70s and '80s with the arrival of the car industry to the region. Companies such as General Motors and Chrysler, along with their respective satellite companies or suppliers, came to Saltillo. Since then, Saltillo and its Metropolitan Zone (Ramos Arizpe and Arteaga) are known as the "Detroit of Mexico". However, a movement is currently underway to diversify the industry, with the arrival of pharmaceutical companies, household appliances, chemicals, ceramics, and even parts for the aerospace industry.

Government
The city of Saltillo is the municipal seat of the municipality of Saltillo. The current mayor is José María Fraustro Siller, from the Partido Revolucionario Institucional (PRI).

Geography
El Cerro del Pueblo (The People's Hill) and its  cross overlook the city. The city's elevation makes it colder and windier than the neighboring city of Monterrey. Saltillo lies in the Chihuahuan Desert near the city of Arteaga. The city is flanked by the Zapalinamé mountains, which are part of the Sierra Madre Oriental. According to local legend, by looking at the relief of the mountains one can see the relief of Zapalinamé, chieftain of the Guachichil tribe.

Orography and hydrography

San Lorenzo Canyon

Composed of geological formations of the Jurassic period, the San Lorenzo Canyon, located southeast of Saltillo in the Sierra de Zapalinamé, is a tourist attraction for outdoor activities and extreme sports such as rock climbing, rappelling, mountain biking, hiking, mountaineering and camping.

Arroyo de los Ojitos

It begins south of Francisco Coss Boulevard, crosses the Venustiano Carranza Boulevard, passes between the Liverpool and Home Depot buildings, and is channeled through Nazario Boulevard Ortiz towards Benito Juárez Street.

Arroyo de la Tortola

It begins its course in the Magisterio neighborhood, towards the temple of Santo Cristo del Ojo de Agua, crosses the center of the city between the streets Arteaga and Matamoros near the Coahuila school, then converges with the channel that descends near Antonio Cárdenas Street (or South Abasolo), is channeled underground through the Topo Chico neighbourhood, down through Nava Street and then by Luis Echeverría and down again by Abasolo Norte and connects in Nazario Ortiz with the Charquillo.

Arroyo del Charquillo

It starts from the eastern end of the Ateneo street, goes down behind the sports San Isidro passing to the side of Campo Redondo, crosses the lake of the Sports City towards the Tecnológico de Monterrey and continues until converging with the Cevallos stream at the Boulevard Moctezuma or Pedro Figueroa.

Cevallos Creek

It starts in the Zapaliname mountain range, from the Lomas de Lourdes neighborhood, it passes along the Luis Echeverría Oriente Boulevard, passes behind the Mercado de Abastos, crosses on one side of Plaza Sendero, then descends along Tezcatlipoca street, passes near the Club Campestre and converges with the Navarreña stream on the road to Monterrey and on the way to the Valdés.

Arroyo de la Navarreña

Starts in the mountains near the Vista Hermosa neighborhood, crosswise through neighborhoods such as Founders and Morelos, goes down the side of the Corona Motel on Fundadores Boulevard, pass by the Dolores Pantheon on Jesus Valdés Sánchez Boulevard and continues towards the South, surrounding the Country Club on its east side and the Country Club subdivision and continues to the city of Ramos.

Land El Aguaje

Located in the San Lorenzo Canyon southeast of the city of Saltillo. Composed of geological formations originated between the Upper Jurassic and Quaternary that facilitate the intense infiltration of water to the subsoil, thus allowing the constant recharge of the aquifers that supply drinking water to the city of Saltillo.On July 3, 2008, the Government of the State of Coahuila decided to buy the property, which was granted to Mexican Wildlife Protection in bailment on July 23, 2012, for its management and conservation.

Sierra La Concordia

It is the highest mountain in the municipality, reaches 3,462 meters above sea level.

Sierra Catana

The Sierra Catana mountain reaches 3,104 meters above sea level.

Climate
Saltillo has a semi-arid climate (Köppen climate classification BSh). Saltillo is located in the Chihuahuan Desert but temperatures are cooler than other desert cities in Mexico because it is located at an altitude of 1,600 meters (5,250 ft). Summers are slightly hot with cool nights, and winters are sunny but cool. Rainfall is scarce but more prominent in summer. Snowfall and sub-freezing temperatures are not unknown, but do not occur every year.

Economy

Saltillo's most famous exports are Saltillo tile and the locally woven multi-colored sarapes. Mercedes-Benz and General Motors both have assembly plants there and Chrysler operates a truck assembly plant, a sedan assembly plant, two engine facilities, and a car transmissions plant. Of all the vehicles made in Mexico, 37.4% of cars and 62.6% of trucks are assembled in Saltillo. Saltillo is home to the Grupo Industrial Saltillo, an important manufacturing conglomerate that makes home appliances, silverware, and auto parts.

The General Motors plant manufactures vehicles for export to Japan, Canada, and Central America as well as for domestic purchase. It builds the Chevrolet C2, Chevrolet Monza, Chevrolet Captiva, Chevrolet HHR, Saturn Vue hybrid, Saab 9-4X and Cadillac SRX. As of 2016 the plant produces about one third of the firm's full-sized pick-up trucks.

Education

Saltillo's main universities are the Universidad Autónoma de Coahuila, the Instituto Tecnológico de Saltillo, the Tec de Monterrey Saltillo Campus, El Instituto de Filologia Hispanica, the Universidad Carolina and the Universidad Autónoma Agraria Antonio Narro.

Sites of interest

Cultural

 'Fernando Soler City Theater:'  Designed by the architect Francisco Flores Flores, it opened on March 26, 1979. The theater hosts plays, operas, music, dance, children's shows, festivals, conferences, government reports, graduations, and congresses. The first performance in this theater was "The Efforts of a House" by Sor Juana Inés de la Cruz, under the direction of Luis G. Basurto with scenery by David Antón and the actors Magda Guzmán, Rubén Rojo, José Baviera, and Carmen Monje, among others.
 'Paraninfo del Ateneo Fuente:'  Auditorium in the Universidad Autonoma de Coahuila, which holds academic and cultural events. Has mural works by the Catalan painter Salvador Tarazona, of which the one on the north side is dedicated to science and the one on the south side is dedicated to arts and culture.
 'Casa Purcell Cultural Center:'  Architectural work built in the 19th century by the architect Alfredo Gilles in the style of the old houses of Ireland. Previously owned by Guillermo Purcell, it is now a cultural center that has exhibition spaces for contemporary art.
 'García Carrillo Theater Cultural Center:'  It has a gallery for temporary exhibitions. It also has an auditorium where conferences, concerts, readings and, film projections are held. 
 'The Cultural Center Vito Alessio Robles:'  Former headquarters of the City Council of Saltillo, it has a mural by Helena Huerta on the history of Coahuila, personal objects of Don Vito Alessio Robles, a library (with a collection of old books and documents of historians Vito Alessio Robles and Oscar Dávila), and temporary exhibitions of modern art.
 'Coahuilense Institute of Culture:'  Culture and art created in the state are promoted and disseminated here. It has an art gallery, workshops, conference rooms, as well as a bookstore and cafeteria.
 'El Recinto a Juárez:'  It houses the Coahuilense College of Historical Research. It offers library services and holds plays, conferences, book presentations, and other cultural activities.
 'University Cultural Heritage Site:'  House dating from 1680, belonging to the Purcell family during the twentieth century. It was the headquarters of the National Bank of Mexico and from 2005 it is used for displaying the artistic heritage of the city.
 'Aurora Morales de López University Cultural Site:'  A space for artistic expression of the Autonomous University of Coahuila. The site broadcasts and houses works by Coahuilenses.

Religious

 'Cathedral of Santiago Apostol:'  Dedicated to the Apostle St James the greater, the church began its construction in 1745 as a parish and in 1891 became the Cathedral of Saltillo. It combines architectural styles such as baroque and the churrigueresco. Inside, its altarpieces stand out, as well as a collection of 45 oil paintings. The silver front on the altar of San José is an 18th-century piece that participated in the exhibition “Mexico, Splendors of Thirty Centuries” , which toured the US and Mexico for three years.
 'Church of Santo Cristo del Ojo de Agua:'  It is located at the top of the hill where the spring comes from which the name of the city emerges. This church houses a crucified Christ known as the Holy Christ of the Waterhole (Ojo de Agua), to whom many parishioners attribute the presence of the spring, which seems to spring from its base. The temple began to be built around 1917 and the Holy Christ of the Waterhole arrived in the city in 1927 by efforts of the third bishop of Saltillo, Jesús María Echavarría y Aguirre.
 'Parish of San Esteban:'  Temple built in 1592 when the town of San Esteban de la Nueva Tlaxcala was founded, inhabited by the Tlaxcaltecs. 
 'Temple of San Juan Nepomuceno:'  Jesuit temple built in the 19th century. Its neoclassical facade contains unfinished towers, dome, and windows. Inside are oil paintings by Father Gonzalo Carrasco, evangelical sculptures, and a mural of the life of San Juan.
 'Sanctuary of Guadalupe:'  Gothic style church built in 1890. In the upper and central part of the building there is a clock, ogival windows and arch buttresses, characteristic of the Gothic style that arrived in Mexico after the Maximilian Empire.

Museums

In Saltillo there are about 22 museums, including: Museum of the Presidents' Coahuilenses, Campus of the University Cultural Heritage, 'Pinacoteca Ateneo Fuente' of the Autonomous University of Coahuila, Museum-Parish Archive, Hall of Natural History.

 'Museum of the Coahuilenses Presidents:'  Erected to honor the memory and legacy of the five coahuilenses who have been Presidents of Mexico: Melchor Múzquiz, Francisco I. Madero, Eulalio Gutiérrez Ortiz, Roque González Garza and Venustiano Carranza. Display photographs, documents and personal and official objects of these characters. It has the first presidential band that Guadalupe Victoria during his tenure as President.
 'Landín Chapel Museum:'  The old chapel, built at the end of the 18th century, it has been restored and preserved more recently. It includes a museum area where a collection of 20 paintings of religious art from the 17th and 18th centuries is exhibited.
 'Museo de la Angostura:'  In memory of the triumph of Mexican troops against the United States in 1847. It is housed in an old house that was once the State Normal School.
 'Catrina Museum:'  Picturesque space where we can appreciate the history of Catrina, who represents death in the traditional Day of the Dead has a cafeteria where hot chocolate and bread are served every day of the year. 
 'Bird Museum of Mexico:'  It has a collection of more than 2,500 birds, (the largest collection of birds in Mexico and Latin America) mostly belonging to the Mexican territory. The enclosure that houses it was the former Jesuit College «San Juan Nepomuceno».
'Museo del Normalismo:'  Tells the history of education in Coahuila. It has a collection of pedagogical instruments and a room dedicated to distinguished graduates of the Benemérita Normal School of Coahuila.
'Museo del Sarape and Typical Costumes:'  Promotes the investigation and rescue of a material heritage that is part of the identity of both Saltillenses and Mexicans. It exhibits the first sarapes made in the 19th and 20th centuries, as well as the typical costumes of the region.
 'The Gyroscope Museum:'  Science museum.
 'Rubén Herrera Museum:'  House dating from the 18th century, where a collection of the Zacatecan master Rubén Herrera made in Mexico and Europe is displayed. It has a room for temporary exhibitions, auditorium, and library.
 'MAG Graphic Arts Museum:'  In this new Museum in Saltillo, there is an important collection of more than 1,400 objects that belonged to José Guadalupe Posada, Mexican engraver, known for his prints and social cartoons, inspired by Mexican folklore. It seeks to promote knowledge and appreciation of both industrial and artistic printing techniques, value the work of visual artists and rescue the appreciation for the trade of the printers.
 'Cato Museum:'  The journalist and chronicler of the city.
 'Museo del Horror:'  Horror.

Culture

During the twentieth century the city received the nickname of "the Athens of Mexico" for its large number of prominent intellectuals.

Sarape de Saltillo

The sarape (serape, or jorongo) is a rectangular garment, for male use, with or without opening for the head and multicolored stripes. It is one of the most representative objects of Mexico. The serape is a garment of traditional Mexican men's clothing, usually brightly colored and with traditional patterns. It is usually made of wool fiber that maintains heat more efficiently, but is also woven from cotton. The thickness of the yarn chosen for the fabric, as well as its material, the elaboration of each necessary knot and the final size of the serape, are variables that influence the final weight and feel of the serape. It is traditional from various parts of Mexico, as in Saltillo. In fact, it was colonizers of Tlaxcalan origin who took the serape to Coahuila from Zaragoza, Zacatecas and probably to New Mexico. 

It serves as a coat, blanket, bedspread, tablecloth or cape. It also decorates walls and floors, as a tapestry or carpet. Another use is to put it on the horse before climbing to the saddle.

The Saltillo Rondalla of the UAAAN

The city of Saltillo is known for its rondalla, being the highest representative of the Rondallesque movement in Mexico for more than four decades. The  'Rondalla de Saltillo'  went beyond transposing the established limits and creating its own style. It has multiple recordings and has toured several countries, it is characterized by using guitars, requintos, double bass, and vocals. The poet Marco Antonio Aguirre arrived at La Rondalla de Saltillo in 1966 and wrote his story with tours, and 30 recorded albums.

Sports
The following professional clubs are based in Saltillo:

Transportation
Saltillo Metropolitan Area air traffic is served by Plan de Guadalupe International Airport. It takes 15 minutes to get from downtown Saltillo to the airport. It has several flights per day to Mexico City and but no international flights. There is a comprehensive bus system in Saltillo along with many taxis.

Sister cities
The following are sister cities of Saltillo:

 Austin
 Canton
 Guatemala City
 Lansing
 Holguín
 Tlaxcala City
 Windsor

Notable people

Manuel Acuña, 19th-century Mexican writer. He focused on poetry, but also wrote some novels and plays.
Rubén Aguirre, actor best remembered for his portrayal of Professor Jirafales in the television show El Chavo del Ocho.
Vito Alessio Robles, military officer, engineer, writer, journalist, diplomat, and academic who participated in the Mexican Revolution.
Pedro Arce, professional footballer.
Carlos Bee, former U.S. Representative from Texas, son of Hamilton Bee, great-grandson of Thomas Bee.
Ernesto Boardman, competitive archer, gold medalist at the 2015 Pan American Games.
Artemio de Valle Arizpe, writer, lawyer and diplomat.
Humberto Elizondo, film and television actor.
Louis Febre, composer, best known for his work on the television series Smallville.
Armando Fuentes Aguirre, best known as Catón, attorney and writer, author of a number of columns in multiple national newspapers. Chronicler and historian of the city.
Roque González Garza, Mexican general and acting president of the Republic from January to June 1915.
Magda Guzmán, actress.
Roberto 'Flaco' Guzman, prolific film actor from the 1970s to the early 2000s.
Rosario Ibarra, activist and prominent figure in Mexican politics, presidential candidate in 1982 and 1988.
Brissia Mayagoitia, singer.
José Narro Robles, former director of the Faculty of Medicine of the National Autonomous University of Mexico.
Abril Rodríguez, beauty contestant
Andrés Soler, Golden Age of Mexican cinema actor.
Fernando Soler, film actor, director, screenwriter, and producer.
Julio Torri, writer and teacher who formed part of the Ateneo de la Juventud.
Karla Wheelock, mountaineer, writer, and lecturer, first Iberoamerican woman to climb the Seven Summits.

References

Bibliography

External links

Link to tables of population data from Census of 2005 INEGI: Instituto Nacional de Estadística, Geografía e Informática.
Official city website

 
Populated places in Coahuila
Capitals of states of Mexico
Populated places established in 1577
1577 establishments in the Spanish Empire